WIEF may refer to:

 World Islamic Economic Forum
 Wharton India Economic Forum
 WIEF-LD, a low-power television station (channel 18, virtual 47) licensed to serve Augusta, Georgia, United States